Sveti Duh is a dispersed settlement in the hills northeast of Dravograd in the Carinthia region in northern Slovenia.

Church

The local church, from which the settlement gets its name, is dedicated to the Holy Spirit. It was first mentioned in written documents dating to 1616. It is an early 16th-century building with an early 17th-century painted wooden ceiling. It belongs to the Parish of Ojstrica.

References

External links

Sveti Duh on Geopedia

Populated places in the Municipality of Dravograd